Reull Vallis is a valley on Mars that appears to have been carved by water. It runs westward into Hellas Planitia. It is named after the Gaelic word for planet.  It is found in the Hellas quadrangle.

Lineated Floor Deposits 

On the floors of some channels are features called lineated floor deposits.  They are ridged and grooved materials that seem to deflect around obstacles.  They are believed to be ice-rich.  Some glaciers on the Earth show such features.  Lineated floor deposits may be related to lobate debris aprons, which have been proven to contain large amounts of ice.  Reull Vallis, as pictured below, displays these deposits.

Gallery

See also
Dao Vallis
Harmakhis Vallis

References

External links

 Google Mars map centred on Reull Vallis.
Geologic Map of Reull Vallis Region of Mars, by Astrogeology Science Center, U.S. Geological Survey

Valleys and canyons on Mars
Hellas quadrangle